The Iglesia del Santo Cristo del Buen Viaje is located in Havana Vieja on Calle Cristo between Calles Lamparilla y Teniente Rey. Built at a time in which transatlantic crossings were risky, it acquired popularity during colonial times as a temple dedicated to travelers and navigators. Travelers and especially sailors would visit before leaving on a journey, and to pay their respects upon arriving back on land. Later during Cuba's republican era, the devotion to Santa Rita was added to the church.

History

In the place that today occupies the church, in 1604 the congregants of the Third Franciscan Order, erected a modest hermitage called "Ermita del Humilladera" and had as its function the twelfth or final station of the Via Crucis. This ceremony started from the Convento de San Francisco and crossed the city from east to west along Calle de Las Cruces or Calle de la Amargura. Only the enclosure and cover of the central nave remain from that building.

In 1640 the current Plaza del Cristo was built next to the church, which was then known as Plaza Nueva and the chapel became Nuestra Señora del Buen Viaje, replacing the one that existed from the previous century in the neighborhood of Campeche.

In 1693 the temple was enlarged, rebuilt and converted into auxiliary of the Parochial Major Church by Bishop Diego Evelino de Compostela, who later elevated it to a parish in 1703.

In 1899 the church was given to the parishioners of the Order of San Agustín, who restored it.

It was the second parish of the city, after the Iglesia del Espíritu Santo.

Architecture

The Augustinians began restoration efforts of Santo Cristo del Buen Viaje following the hurricane of 1926 when the architectural firm of Leonardo Morales y Pedroso, architects of the El Colegio de Belen, was contracted to renovate Santo Cristo. The original stone walls were demolished so as to expand the transept; new stonework replaced the original parts of the church, and decorative elements were modified. The aisles were enlarged and Tuscan columns were added; nine stone altars were added each devoted to a particular saint who had not previously been worshipped in at Buen Viaje. The crucifix of the original hermitage was hung on the church's back wall. In 1993 the ceiling of the presbytery collapsed. The wood ceiling has been restored since then.

The Iglesia Santo Cristo del Buen Viaje is distinguished for its simplicity, symmetry and baroque façade; it is also notable for its twin hexagonal towers, the tower of the Epistle and the tower of the Gospel. The latter contains four bells, the oldest was cast in the year 1515. There is an outward flaring arch over the entryway. The nave has a Hispano-moorish Mudéjar wood ceiling and an ancient crucifix which is over three centuries old. The Iglesia Santo Cristo del Buen Viaje was the last station on the Stations of the Cross, a procession that started at the old St Francis church and proceeded to el Santo Cristo through Calle Amargura. The church and its Plaza have received penitents in need of spiritual rest and comfort for centuries.

Plaza de las Lavanderas

In the mid-17-century, three blocks southeast of Parque Central and two blocks south of Calle Obispo, the small plaza takes its name from the Iglesia del Santo Cristo del Buen Viaje. Plaza del Cristo was created in 1640 when the square was first known as Plaza Nueva. The hermitage was the twelfth station of the Vía Crucis (Procession of the Cross), which took place annually during Lent and led along Calle Amargura from the Plaza de San Francisco. The Baroque Iglesia del Santo Cristo del Buen Viaje now covers the site of the old hermitage on the north-western side of the plaza. Of the original building, only the enclosure and painted wood ceiling still remain. Later, the square was briefly known as Plaza de las Lavanderas; “Plaza of the Washerwomen”, named because of the large number of Afro-Cuban washerwomen that met to attend mass.

Graham Greene's used this small plaza for the setting of his protagonist Wormold (the vacuum-cleaner salesman-secret agent) was “swallowed up among the pimps and lottery sellers of the Havana noon” in his film Our Man in Havana. Wormold and his daughter Milly lived at Lamparilla #37—a fictional address (one block west of the plaza) occupied by a small plaza.

As in most of Havana, the predominantly residential 19th-century buildings surrounding the dilapidated square have fallen into a  state of disrepair, (even Wormold had sensed “a slow erosion of Havana”); several buildings have collapsed, while others threaten to do so. In 2014, a comprehensive restoration was initiated by the Eusebio Leal of the City Historian's Office.

Gallery

See also

 List of buildings in Havana
 Havana Plan Piloto

 Hospital de San Lázaro, Havana

Notes

References

External links

 Digital Photographic Archive of Historic Havana

Religious buildings and structures in Havana
Buildings and structures in Havana
Churches in Havana
Roman Catholic churches in Havana
15th-century Roman Catholic church buildings
Tourist attractions in Havana
History of Havana

Architecture in Havana
Neoclassical church buildings in Cuba